Marcin Siedlarz (born 15 February 1988 in Kraków, Poland) is a Polish footballer, who plays as a midfielder for Flota Świnoujście.

References

External links
 
 Gazzetta dello Sport player profile 

1988 births
Living people
Polish footballers
Polish expatriates in Italy
Association football midfielders
Hutnik Nowa Huta players
Górnik Zabrze players
Widzew Łódź players
A.C.N. Siena 1904 players
Ruch Chorzów players
GKS Katowice players
Flota Świnoujście players
Footballers from Kraków
Przebój Wolbrom players